They Call Me Mr. Melody is a studio album by a Jamaican reggae singer Singing Melody.  The album was released on January 17, 2012 through S.H.E.M. MUSIC/FAT EYES/VPAL.

Production 
The album is Singing Melody's seventh, taking him two years to complete.

Producers of this album include Grammy award winners Dave Kelly, as well as Donovan Germaine of Penthouse Records and Lynford 'Fatta' Marshall.

Reception 
The lead single, "Collide", became #1 on 4 international Reggae charts.  The album also reached #6 on the Billboard Reggae Chart.

Track listing

References

External links
 vpreggae.com

Singing Melody albums
2012 albums